"Fey's Sleigh Ride" is an episode from the dramedy series Ugly Betty. It is the fourth episode in the United States, Canada and Australia but is the fifth overall. The episode first aired on October 19, 2006, even though it was scheduled to air October 26, 2006. This would be the first Ugly Betty episode writing and production duties for Shelia Lawrence and Tricia Brock, respectively.

Plot

At a popular bar frequented by fashion magazine staffers, Marc and Amanda show Betty how to mingle now that she has become well known among the elite. Marc and Amanda want to see how badly Betty will goof up, but these plans take a turn for the worse. At the bar they see Carlos Medina, who works at rival mag Isabella. He separately introduces himself to Betty, Marc and Amanda and buys them each a drink. They also meet another Mode employee, "Fat" Carol, who is more critical of her co-workers.

The following day, Wilhelmina discovers someone leaked the ideas for the upcoming Christmas spread to Isabella through Carlos, and vows to fire anyone who was responsible for leaking the winter spread concept (as Amanda points to a similar incident in 2003 and Marc learns that he can be replaced with five others waiting on speed-dial). This casts suspicion on the three people who talked to Carlos: Betty, Marc and Amanda. Each has different reactions after the leak is revealed: Betty worries about being a liar in order to keep her job, Marc has frequent asthma attacks, and Amanda eats at every opportunity.

The three try to keep their cool and hopefully keep from dealing with Wilhelmina, but fret over their future as every other department gets grilled and cleared, and then Wilhelmina finally calls them in. Betty admits to revealing a few details to Carlos, while Marc and Amanda pin everything on Carol, it turns out that Wilhelmina accepts that they are not the culprits: they did give some details but Carol slept with Carlos and told him everything. All three keep their jobs, and in a story twist, Carlos is called into Wilhelmina's office and offered a job to become a mole at Isabella to leak details to Mode.

Thanks to the leak, Daniel decides to go with a new spread, based on the 1986 spread featuring Fey Sommers riding a sleigh. Vincent likes the idea, and Daniel and Wilhelmina agree that it is a way to honor the late editor-in-chief. Daniel's decision adds a piece to the puzzle involving the music box that Bradford took, but which is now missing. Thanks to Wilhelmina, the mystery woman has it in her possession. She then leaves a message with Betty to pass to Daniel that he should pay close attention to what is inside the music box. Later, it shows up in Daniel's office. Betty takes a closer look, lifting the inside portion, and finds a burned license plate with the words FEY and a set of burned glasses. The sight of the music box brings back painful memories for Daniel, who remembers how Bradford went to Switzerland and bought two sets of music boxes, one for Fey and one for Daniel's mother Claire. Claire knew about Bradford's affair and went ballistic by burning a stack of magazines to the point of becoming unstable and was sent away. At the photo shoot, Daniel shows Bradford a music box to be placed on the sleigh, but turns out to be an homage to his mother Claire.

Walter is still showing up at Betty's home; she is still upset over his mistake and he is jealous over her upscale job, prompting Ignacio to give him a few tips on how to win back Betty. This works in the end when he swoons her with a karaoke rendition of "Beauty and the Beast", which is Betty's favorite movie.

Also at home, Justin springs a school project on Betty by convincing her to take him to work so he can see his aunt in action. He proves to fashion-conscious for a person of his age, pointing out the shoes Amanda is wearing (a pair of 2004 Manolos), something that even Marc had failed to notice. When Hilda learns from Justin's teacher that he was ditching school, Betty convinces Justin to come clean. In the end, Hilda grounds him, forbidding him to watch Fashion TV for a month.

As for Ignacio, he is still getting his secret caffeine fixes. When he gets a call from his HMO provider for his appointment, he lies, telling the provider that he is alright and does not need to see a doctor. It appears that Ignacio might have a secret reason why he will not go to see a doctor. When Betty goes to the provider, she discovers that her father has been using a false Social Security number: the real Ignacio would be 117 years old and is dead. This leaves her stunned and filled with more questions than answers about her father.

Production
This was to be the fifth episode, but was bumped up when the episode "Swag" was postponed. "Swag" ended up airing as episode eleven with some new scenes edited in to make it a flashback episode. There were a few scenes that were edited out, including the one where Wilhelmina took the music box from Bradford's office and gave it to the "Mystery Woman." That filmed scene was shown at the beginning of this episode as a "Previously on Ugly Betty" recap. In the scenes when the music box was playing in this episode, the components did not move.

The episode also featured the fourth installment of the telenovelita Vidas de Fuego, this time with Marlene Favela appearing as a nun who seduces the soccer player (Luis Roberto Guzmán), who was seen in the third episode. Favela also played the pregnant maid who happen to be the nun's twin sister.

In one scene Daniel mentions that MODE is 50 years old, which means it has been in business since 1956. The rival fashion magazine in this episode, Isabella, may be a tongue-in-cheek reference to another fashion magazine that rivaled Vogue, Mirabella.

Reception
From Entertainment Weekly's Michael Slezak: "Not to get all Joey Lawrence on you guys, but Whoa! Tonight, for the first time in its four-episode run, Ugly Betty gave me the chills, and to my surprise, said shivers arrived during a scene pertaining to the show's central mystery, the untimely death of Fey Sommers."

Ratings
The episode was watched by 13.1 million viewers in the United States, its fifth-highest in the series overall.

References

Also starring
Michael Urie - Marc St. James
Kevin Sussman - Walter
Elizabeth Payne - Masked Woman
Stelio Savante - Steve
Diane Cary - Bradford's Assistant

Guest stars
Rhys Coiro - Vincent Bianchi
Cleo King - Anne Fraiser
Miranda Frigon - Carol
Nicholas Gonzalez - Carlo Medina

Ugly Betty (season 1) episodes
2006 American television episodes